Acromantis indica, common name Burmese mantis, is a species of praying mantis found in Myanmar and elsewhere in Indo-China.

See also
List of mantis genera and species

References

Indica
Mantodea of Southeast Asia
Endemic fauna of Myanmar
Insects of Myanmar
Insects described in 1915